"Verge" is a song by American electronica project Owl City from his fifth studio album Mobile Orchestra. It features guest vocals from American singer Aloe Blacc and was released on May 14, 2015 as the lead single from the album.

Background
After the song was previewed on ESPN's Draft Academy on May 5, it was announced that "Verge", featuring Aloe Blacc would be released on May 14 as the album's first single. A lyric video of "Verge" was later published on Owl City's VEVO channel on YouTube on May 13, 2015.

Owl City frontman Adam Young also adds, "You're thinking about those moments in life where you're on the edge. It's like the last day of your life as you know it, and tomorrow everything is going to change. It could be a college graduation. It could be a new career. It could be your wedding day. You're not sure how it's going to go, but you're confident that you're going to hit the ground running. We reached out to Aloe out of nowhere, and he was so gracious and kind to lend his incredible talent to the track."

In an interview with Yahoo Music, he also mentions: "It was an honor to work with Blacc and his contribution to the song is invaluable."

Composition
On Owl City's official website, "Verge" is stated as "...his bright, buoyant production and shimmering vocals with a booming soulful refrain from Aloe Blacc. It blurs the lines between electro, alternative, pop, and R&B all at once, while remaining perfect for the dance floor."

Release and promotion
"Verge" reached number 44 on the Japan Hot 100 chart list and number 3 on the Twitter Real-Time Chart, despite having mixed critical reviews. In September 2015, Owl City announced that Verge: The Remixes would be available on September 11, 2015. The three-track EP featured remixes of "Verge" by Tom Swoon, Low Steppa, and Transcode.

Music video
On May 28, the music video premiered on Yahoo Music! and was made available on VEVO and YouTube the next day.

Track listing
Digital download

The Remixes

Charts

Weekly charts

Year-end charts

References 

2015 singles
2015 songs
Aloe Blacc songs
Owl City songs
Republic Records singles
Songs written by Adam Young
Songs written by Aloe Blacc
Songs written by Matt Thiessen
Songs written by Emily Wright